Beautiful Machine is the seventh studio album by Shihad and was released on 21 April 2008 in New Zealand and 17 May 2008 in Australia.

The album is much softer than previous Shihad releases, including many electronica elements and '80s backing rhythms - to the point where lead singer Jon Toogood has called some tracks "dance songs".

The lead single "One Will Hear the Other" was released early January 2008, where it peaked as the second most played Kiwi song. "Vampires" was the album's second single and surpassed "One Will Hear the Other" in airplay, peaking as the number one most played Kiwi song shortly after its release.

Beautiful Machine entered the New Zealand Music Chart at number 1, going Gold on its first day of release (7,500+ sales). Despite this achievement it failed to go Platinum, Shihad's first album to not do so in 12 years.

Like Shihad's previous album Love Is the New Hate, Beautiful Machines top position on the Australian ARIA Albums Chart was 11.

Track listing

"One Will Hear The Other" - 4:01
"Rule The World" - 4:22
"Hard To Please" - 3:59
"Beautiful Machine" - 4:14
"Vampires" - 4:04
"Count It Up" - 2:22
"Waiting Around For God" - 5:13
"Chameleon" - 3:37
"Eliza" - 4:39
"The Bible And The Gun" - 4:22
"When You Coming Home?" - 3:44
"The Prophet" - 5:14

2 CD Bonus Disk Tracks:

"Lowlife" - 3:15
"Won't Let You Down" 4:09
"Skank" (Played live 2007) - 3:50
"It's a Crime" - 4:39
"Lightbulb" - 2:49
"Name Your Price" - 4:22

iTunes Only Bonus Tracks:

"Violence+Bloodshed"
"Easy Life Romance"
"No Religion (Getting Nowhere Fast)"

Unreleased B-Sides:

"Settle Down"
"Michaelangelo"
"Alazama"
"Outta Here" (Played live 2006)
"Whatever" (Played live 2006)

Certifications

References

2008 albums
ARIA Award-winning albums
Shihad albums